Arthur Hamilton (1905-unknown), was a male Irish badminton international.

Badminton career
Arthur born in 1905  won three Scottish Open titles and the 1932 Welsh International title in the doubles.

Family
Arthur came from a famous sporting playing family. His father Blayney Hamilton was a badminton and cricket international, his uncle William Drummond Hamilton represented Ireland at cricket and tennis, another uncle Willoughby Hamilton was world ranked number one at tennis at one time and a third uncle Francis Cole Lowry Hamilton played cricket for Ireland. In addition two of his siblings were badminton internationals (Willoughby Hamilton and Mavis Hamilton).

References

Irish male badminton players
1905 births
Year of death missing
Hamilton family (Ireland)